The list of St. John's Seminary (California) people is a compilation of lists of notable alumni, faculty, and current students of St. John's Seminary in Camarillo, California, United States.  St. John's Seminary grants graduate degrees for seminarians preparing for the priesthood, as well as a graduate degree for lay persons interested in pastoral ministry.  The St. John's Seminary College was the undergraduate division of the seminary before it closed in the early 21st century.  The table of notable alumni lists the date of graduation from St. John's college, seminary, or both, if applicable.  It is not unusual for seminarians to have received their undergraduate education at a different institution than their seminary training.

Notable alumni

Notable seminarian alumni

Notable faculty

Timothy T. O'Donnell

Rectors
There have been 12 rectors of St. John's Seminary since its opening in 1939 and several presidents of the College during its time of operation (1961-2002).  The seminary was originally administered by the Vincentian Fathers (C.M.), but has been operated by the Archdiocese since 1987.

References

Saint John's Seminary (California)
St. John's Seminary (California)
Saint John's Seminary (California)